David Thompson or David Thomson (1588–1628) was the first governor of Massachusetts under the 1622 Council for New England grant to Robert Gorges. He also held the 6000-acre 1622 Piscataqua grant under the Council and is considered the founder and first non-native settler of New Hampshire. In addition, Thomson was granted a patent for Thompson Island in Boston Harbor which to this day bears his name. According to Burke's Landed Gentry (2010) the Thomsons of Corstorphine are direct descendants of a great-grandson of King Robert II, namely, Sir Thomas Stewart, Master of Mar.

Early life and ancestry
David Thompson or Thomson was born in Corstorphine, a village in the Kingdom of Scotland. His father was the Reverend Richard Thomson (c. 1564-1606), who had received an ecclesiastical appointment from James VI of Scotland (reigned 1567–1625). The identity of David's mother is unknown. His stepmother (Richard Thomson's second wife) was Agnes Foulis.

Richard Thomson was the son of Bernard Thomson and Agnes Balzert. His paternal grandparents were Alexander Thomson (d. 1587) and Janet Gourlay, daughter of Baron William Gourlay, 9th of Kincraig. His great-grandparents were Alexander Thomson (c. 1460-1513) and Margaret Forrester. This Alexander died in combat during the Battle of Flodden (1513). Margaret was reportedly a great-granddaughter of John Forrester of Corstorphine, who had served as Lord High Chamberlain of Scotland.

Alexander Thomson (c. 1460-1513) was thought to be a son or grandson of Thomas Stewart, Master of Mar. The name Thomson is a Scottish patronymic surname, and literally means "son of Thomas". Thomas Stewart was a son of Alexander Stewart, Earl of Mar (d. 1435), grandson to Alexander Stewart, Earl of Buchan, and great-grandson of Robert II of Scotland and Elizabeth Mure.

David Thompson is first mentioned in 1602, when he received a bursary to attend the University of Edinburgh and study philosophy. David was named heir to his father in 1607 during a "retour", return to Chancery, "an inquest that took place in the court of the sheriffdom of Edinburgh held in the town-house of the same burgh in the presence of Mr. William Stewart Sheriff." Thomson married Amias Cole, the daughter of Plymouth, England shipwright, William Cole on July 13, 1613. They had three children, Ann, Priscilla, and John, before Thompson returned to New England. A 2nd son, Miles, may have been born on Thomson's Island in 1627. In England, Thompson came to know Squanto before his return to Plymouth, Massachusetts, and Thompson sailed with Squanto to New England in 1619. Thompson helped rescue a stranded Native American boy on the Isle of Shoals during his 1619 trip, and the boy was given to Thompson as a servant by the local sachem.

Background of founding the New Hampshire colony
The colony that became the state of New Hampshire was founded on a 6,000 acre land grant given in 1622 by the Council for New England to Mr. David Thomson, gent. In 1629, following Thomson's death, Captain John Mason (former governor of Newfoundland) and Sir Ferdinando Gorges (who founded Maine) granted the territory to themselves. The colony was named "New Hampshire" by Mason after the English county of Hampshire, one of the first Saxon shires. Though historians have assumed that David Thomson was acting on the behest of Gorges and Mason, he acted independent of them but rather served as an agent to the Council and at times, acted as its attorney. Thomson's stepmother, Agnes Foulis' niece was married to Thomas Hamilton, the Secretary of State of Scotland. Agnes' nephew, David Foulis, Baron Ingleby, was King James' ambassador to England's Queen Elizabeth. Following the Queen's death in 1603, Foulis served as the cofferer to Prince Henry Stuart. And David's father, Magister Rev. Richard Thomson was well known to King James and worked in coordination with the monarch to reign in certain ministers that challenged the King's authority.

David Thompson first settled at Odiorne's Point in Rye (near Portsmouth) with a group of craftsmen and fishermen from England in 1623, just three years after the Pilgrims landed at Plymouth. The settlers built a fort, manor house and other buildings, some for fish processing, on Flake Hill at the mouth of the Piscataqua River, naming the settlement "Pannaway Plantation". In 1623 the English explorer Christopher Levett, an associate of Gorges and a member of the Council for New England, wrote of visiting Thompson at his Pannaway Plantation. Early historians believed the first native-born New Hampshire, John Thompson, was born there; later he was found to have been baptized at St. Andrew's Parish in Plymouth, England, in 1619.

Disappearance after moving to Boston
David Thompson's grant for 6000 acres was divided into two parts. According to an Indenture signed in Plymouth, England, Thomson received 3/4 of the plantation and 1/4 was held by three former mayors of Plymouth, Abraham Colmer, Nicholas Sherwill, and Leonard Pomery. Thomson was to send out seven men with him on the ship, the Jonathan of Plymouth, and the former lord-mayors who were also merchants, "will this present year, at their own charge, provide and send three men more, in the ship " Providence," of Plymouth, if they may be so soon gotten, or in some other ship, with the first expedition that may be, to New England; the charges of these three men to be borne equally by all the parties." The Hiltons, Edward and William may have settled on a portion of the 600-acre allotment to the three mayors. Thompson moved his family to an island in Boston Harbor (today called Thompson Island in his honor) in 1626, and he may have had a fur trading post on the island prior to moving there. The Thompsons became some of the first European settlers of Boston, Massachusetts. David Thompson disappeared in 1628 and was never heard from again. Some historians theorize he was the victim of foul play. Others suggest that he accidentally drowned in Boston Harbor. Thompson's widow, Amias (1596–1672), remarried to Samuel Maverick of Noddle's Island. Thomson's son, John, later successfully recovered ownership of the island from the town of Dorchester, before another party acquired it. John Thomson was among the first settlers in Mendon, MA. His brother, Miles, settled in Berwick, Maine.

See also
List of people who disappeared

References

1588 births
1620s missing person cases
1628 deaths
16th-century Scottish people
17th-century Scottish people
Alumni of the University of Edinburgh
David
Kingdom of Scotland emigrants to the Thirteen Colonies
Missing person cases in Massachusetts
People from colonial Boston
People from Edinburgh
People from Rye, New Hampshire
People from Sagadahoc County, Maine
People of colonial Massachusetts
People of colonial Maine
People of colonial New Hampshire
Year of death unknown